A daughter is a female offspring; a girl or a woman in relation to her parents. Daughterhood is the state of being someone's daughter. The male counterpart is a son. Analogously the name is used in several areas to show relations between groups or elements. From biological perspective, a daughter is a first degree relative. The word daughter also has several other connotations attached to it, one of these being used in reference to a female descendant or consanguinity. It can also be used as a term of endearment coming from an elder.

In patriarchal societies, daughters often have different or lesser familial rights than sons. A family may prefer to have sons rather than daughters and subject daughters to female infanticide.  In some societies it is the custom for a daughter to be 'sold' to her husband, who must pay a bride price. The reverse of this custom, where the parents pay the husband a sum of money to compensate for the financial burden of the woman and is known as a dowry. The payment of a dowry can be found in societies where women do not labour outside the home.

Perception
In the United States, the birth rate is 105 sons to 100 daughters which has been the natural birth rate since the 18th century. In the US, prospective parents seeking to adopt a child display a slight preference for girls over boys.  In fertility clinics that enable sex preferences, daughters are usually preferred over sons. In the traditions of various Abrahamic religions, Luluwa is regarded as the first daughter to have ever existed.

Daughters in literature 
The role of the daughter has been an important theme in literature, especially when exploring relationships between family members and gender roles. Through exploration of the relationship between children and their parents, readers can draw conclusions about the impact of parenting style on the growth and development of a child's character and personality.

Notable daughters whose character and development has been impacted by their parents in literature have been:

See also
Nurture kinship
Woman

References
5. Britannica. (n.d.). Dowry. Encyclopædia Britannica. https://www.britannica.com/topic/dowry.

External links

Explanation of dowry

Family
Women by role
Terms for women